The Numtums is a British animated children's television series created by Barry Quinn for CBeebies. It is about a group of 10 creatures called the Numtums, each with a number on their tummies. The show debuted on CBeebies in the United Kingdom on 27 February 2012, and ended on 15 December 2014 with a total of 3 series.

Series overview

Episodes

Series 1 (2011)

Series 2 (2013)

Series 3 (2013-18)

References

Lists of British children's television series episodes
Lists of British animated television series episodes